Marie-Louise Eta (born 7 July 1991) is a German former footballer who played as a midfielder for Frauen-Bundesliga club Werder Bremen. She has also played for Turbine Potsdam.

Club career
Eta retired from playing at the end of the 2017–18 season, aged 26.

International career
As an Under-19 international she played the 2009 and 2010 U-19 European Championships.

Personal life
She married Benjamin Eta in 2014.

Honours
Germany
 FIFA U-20 Women's World Cup: 2010
 UEFA Women's Under-17 Championship: 2008
 FIFA U-17 Women's World Cup: third place 2008

1. FFC Turbine Potsdam
 UEFA Women's Champions League: 2010
 Bundesliga: 2009, 2010, 2011
 DFB-Hallenpokal: 2009, 2010

References

External links
 Werder Bremen bio
 

1991 births
Living people
German women's footballers
Footballers from Dresden
Women's association football midfielders
Frauen-Bundesliga players
SV Werder Bremen (women) players